St Mary's is located in the centre of the village of Portskewett, Monmouthshire.  It is a Grade I listed building as of 19 August 1955.

History and architecture

The church has a Norman nave and further substantial Norman elements, a medieval chancel and was extended and renovated in the early and late 19th century.  The style is Gothic Decorated.  The list of Rectors dates back to 1427, and its registers to 1593.

Services are held at the church on every Sunday at 9.15 except the first Sunday of every month at 11.00a.m.

References

Portskewett
Portskewett